Raúl Alejandro Palacios Gamboa (born 30 October 1976) is a Chilean former footballer who played as a midfielder.

Career
He has played in several teams, in- and outside Chile.

At international level, Palacios was a member of the Chilean squad at the 1999 Copa América, where the team finished in fourth place. In addition, he made an appearance for Chile B in the friendly match against Catalonia on 28 December 2001.

Honours
Colo-Colo
 Copa Chile: 1994

Chile
 : 2000

References

External links
 
 
 
 Raúl Palacios at PlaymakerStats

1976 births
Living people
People from Los Andes Province, Chile
Chilean footballers
Chilean expatriate footballers
Chile international footballers
Colo-Colo footballers
Unión San Felipe footballers
Everton de Viña del Mar footballers
Santiago Morning footballers
Racing de Ferrol footballers
Unión Española footballers
Colorado Rapids players
Coquimbo Unido footballers
Deportes La Serena footballers
C.D. Antofagasta footballers
San Marcos de Arica footballers
Chilean Primera División players
Primera B de Chile players
Segunda División players
Major League Soccer players
Chilean expatriate sportspeople in Spain
Chilean expatriate sportspeople in the United States
Expatriate footballers in Spain
Expatriate soccer players in the United States
1999 Copa América players
Association football midfielders